Brigitte Ntiamoah (born 5 March 1994 in Mulhouse) is a French athlete, who specialises in sprinting.

Biography 
Running for team l'Entente Grand Mulhouse Athle, Brigitte was champion for cadettes in the 400m in 2011 and junior champion of France for the 200 m in 2012 (outdoor and indoor). In 2013, during the European Junior Championships at RietiIt, she took fifth in the 200m and won the silver medal in the 4 × 100m Relay. She became the Under 21 champion of France in the 200m in 2014.

Early in the 2015 season, Brigitte Ntiamoah won the 200m at the Indoor French championships at Aubière, with a time of 23.57s. In July 2015, she won the bronze medal at the Under 21 European Championships at Tallinn.

Ntiamoah competed for France at the 2016 Summer Olympics.

Her elder brother  Edmond was professional footballer and is now the logistics manager for the large confectionery firm Bachmann in Switzerland.

Prize list

International

National 
 French Championships in Athletics   :  
 3rd in the 200m in 2014   
 Indoor French Athletics Championships :  
 winner of the 200 m in 2015 3rd in 2014

Records

References

External links 
 
 
 
 

Living people
1994 births
French female sprinters
Sportspeople from Mulhouse
European Athletics Championships medalists
Olympic athletes of France
Athletes (track and field) at the 2016 Summer Olympics
Athletes (track and field) at the 2020 Summer Olympics
Olympic female sprinters